The following is a list of massacres that have occurred in Albania (numbers may be approximate):

Albania
Massacres